Rawicz is a town in west-central Poland with 21,398 inhabitants as of 2004. It is situated in the Greater Poland Voivodeship (since 1999); previously it was in Leszno Voivodeship (1975–1998). It is the capital of Rawicz County.

History
The town was founded by Adam Olbracht Przyjemski of Rawicz coat of arms for Protestant refugees from Silesia during the Thirty Years' War. In 1638 King Władysław IV Vasa granted Rawicz town rights and confirmed the town's coat of arms. Rawicz was built as a precisely planned town and developed at a rapid pace. It was located on the trade route connecting Poznań and Wrocław. In 1640, a cloth guild was founded. Cloth production became a leading branch of the local industry, and by the end of the 18th century Rawicz was the leading weaving town of the whole region of Greater Poland. Rawicz was a private town of Polish nobility, administratively located in the Kościan County in the Poznań Voivodeship in the Greater Poland Province of the Polish Crown.

After the destruction of Rawicz by the Swedes in 1655 during the Deluge, the town was rebuilt in an impressive way, erecting new townhouses, a Baroque church and a Catholic monastery. The early 18th century was an unfavorable period in the town's history. In 1701 it suffered a fire, in 1704-1705 it was occupied by Sweden, foreign troops marched through it: Russians in 1707, Austrians in 1719, Saxons in 1733. In the following decades, rapid development took place again, the construction of the castle was completed and a new Baroque town hall was built. In the second half of the 18th century, there were two breweries, a distillery, a slaughterhouse, and a brickyard in Rawicz.

In 1793, Rawicz was annexed by Prussia as a result of the Second Partition of Poland. In 1807 the town was recovered by Poles as part of the short-lived Duchy of Warsaw and in 1815 it was again annexed by Prussia, initially as part of the autonomous Grand Duchy of Poznan. The principal industry was the manufacture of snuff and cigars. Trade involved grain, wool, cattle, hides, and timber. In 1905 it had 11,403 inhabitants. After World War I Poland regained its independence in 1918. In 1919 the Battle of Rawicz was fought as part of the Greater Poland uprising, aiming to reunite the region with the reestablished Polish state. Rawicz returned to Poland in January 1920.

On the first day of the invasion of Poland, which started World War II on September 1, 1939, the Germans entered the town, but were forced to withdraw. They entered again on September 5. In the following days the Einsatzgruppe III entered the town to commit crimes against Poles. Poles arrested during the Intelligenzaktion were imprisoned in the local prison. In October 1939 the Germans carried out the first executions of Polish residents, while first mass expulsions of over 500 Poles were carried out in December 1939. The expelled Poles were predominantly local activists and owners of better houses, which were then handed over to German colonists as part of the Lebensraum policy. Also a transit camp for Poles expelled from nearby villages was operated in the town. Despite such circumstances, the Polish resistance movement was organized in the town. In January 1945, the town was taken over by the Soviets, who imprisoned soldiers of the Polish Home Army here. Later on, the Soviet-appointed communists organized a prison here for political opponents, of which 142 died here.

In 1973, Sarnowa was included within the town limits.

A large prison exists in former monastery since 1820.

A 50 billion cubic feet natural gas discovery at Rawicz in 2015 is expected to be the largest gas development in Poland for 20 years.

Sights
Among the historic sights of Rawicz are the Rynek (Market Square) with the Baroque town hall, the Baroque Church of Saint Andrew the Apostle, the Classicist Church of Saint Andrew Bobola, the Gothic Revival Church of Christ the King, the Planty Park and historic townhouses, dating back to the 18th and 19th century.

Sports
Notable local sports clubs are speedway club Kolejarz Rawicz and football team .

Transport

A railway station is located in the town. The expressway S5 and national road 36 run near the town.

Cuisine
The officially protected traditional food originating from Rawicz is kiełbaska rawicka, a local type of kiełbasa (as designated by the Ministry of Agriculture and Rural Development of Poland). Local traditions of meat production date back hundreds of years.

Notable residents
 Heinrich Gottfried Ollendorff (1803–1865), German grammarian and language educator
 Wolfgang Straßmann (1821–1885), politician
 Heinrich Braun (1862–1934), surgeon 
 Maximilian Otte (1910–1944), Luftwaffe pilot
 Robert Maćkowiak (born 1970), sprinter
 Arthur Ruppin (1876–1943), Zionist 
 Reinhard Seiler (1909–1989), Luftwaffe officer
 Piotr Świderski (born 1983), speedway rider
 Anita Włodarczyk (born 1985), hammer thrower
 Karol Świderski (born 1997), football player

See also 
 Coat of Arms of Rawicz

References

External links

Municipal Website
Rawicz Yizkor (Holocaust Memorial) Book (Hebrew & English)

Cities and towns in Greater Poland Voivodeship
Rawicz County
1638 establishments in the Polish–Lithuanian Commonwealth
Populated places established in 1638
Poznań Voivodeship (1921–1939)